Scudder Mountain is a mountain, 2,280 m, between Organ Pipe Peaks and Mount McKercher on the east side of Scott Glacier in the Queen Maud Mountains, in Antarctica. The name appears in Paul Siple's 1938 botany report on the Byrd Antarctic Expedition, 1933–35, based on exploration of this vicinity by the expedition's geological party led by Quin Blackburn.

Mountains of Marie Byrd Land